The Rainier International Tennis Classic was a men's tennis tournament played in outdoor hard courts in Seattle, Washington from 1972–1973.  The event was part of the Grand Prix tennis circuit.

Finals

Singles

Doubles

References
 ATP World Tour archive

Defunct tennis tournaments in the United States
Grand Prix tennis circuit
Sports in Seattle
Hard court tennis tournaments in the United States
Recurring sporting events established in 1972
Recurring sporting events disestablished in 1973
1972 establishments in Washington (state)
1973 disestablishments in Washington (state)
Tennis in Washington (state)